John "Spider" Miller (born c. 1950) is an American amateur golfer. He represented the United States in the 1999 Walker Cup and was the captain of the team in 2015 and 2017. He won the U.S. Mid-Amateur in 1996 and 1998. Miller owns Best Beers, Inc and is married with five children.

U.S. national team appearances
Walker Cup: 1999, 2015 (non-playing captain), 2017 (non-playing captain, winners)

References

American male golfers
Amateur golfers
People from North Vernon, Indiana
1950 births
Living people